A copyright is the legal protection extended to the owner of the rights in an original work. Original work refers to every production in the literary, scientific, and artistic domains. The Intellectual Property Office (IPOPHL) is the leading agency responsible for handling the registration and conflict resolution of intellectual property rights and to enforce the copyright laws. IPOPHL was created by virtue of Republic Act No. 8293 or the Intellectual Property Code of the Philippines which took effect on January 1, 1998, under the presidency of Fidel V. Ramos.

In the Intellectual Property (IP) Code of the Philippines, literary and artistic works include books, writings, musical works, films, paintings, and other works including computer programs.

Works are created on the sole fact of their very creation - regardless of their mode or form of expression as well as their content, the quality of said content, and purpose.

Works covered 
Works covered by the copyright law are (1) literary and artistic works and (2) derivative works. On the other hand, works not protected by the copyright law are (1) unprotected subject matter and (2) works of the government.

Literary and artistic works 
According to Section 172 of the Intellectual Property Code, literary and artistic works refer to the original and intellectual creations protected from the moment of their creation.

The list of literary and artistic works includes the following:
 Books, pamphlets, articles and other writings.
Periodicals and newspapers
Lectures, sermons, addresses, dissertations prepared for oral delivery, whether or not reduced in writing or other material form
 Letters 
 Dramatic or dramatico-musical compositions; choreographic works or entertainment in dumb shows
 Musical compositions, with or without words
 Works of drawing, painting, architecture, sculpture, engraving, lithography or other works of art; models or designs for works of art.
 Original ornamental designs or models for articles of manufacture, whether or not registrable as an industrial design, and other works of applied art
 Illustrations, maps, plans, sketches, charts and three-dimensional works relative to geography, topography, architecture or science 
 Drawings or plastic works of a scientific or technical character 
Photographic works including works produced by a process analogous to photography; lantern slides
 Audiovisual works and cinematographic works and works produced by a process analogous to cinematography or any process for making audio-visual recordings
 Pictorial illustrations and advertisements
 Computer programs
 Other literary, scholarly, scientific and artistic works

Derivative works 
According to Section 173.2 of the Intellectual Property Code, derivative works are defined as new work provided that they do not violate any subsisting copyright upon the original work employed or any part thereof, or to imply any right to such use of the original works, or to secure or extend copyright in such original works.

The list of derivative works includes the following: 
 Dramatizations, translations, adaptations, abridgements, arrangements, and other alterations of literary or artistic works
 Collections of literary, scholarly or artistic works, and compilations of data and other materials which are original by reason of the selection or coordination or arrangement of their contents.

According to Section 174 which refers to the case of a published edition of work, the publisher has the copyright consisting merely of the right of reproduction of the typographical arrangement of the published edition of the work.

Unprotected subject matter 
The list of unprotected subject matter include the following:
 Any idea, procedure, system, method or operation, concept, principle, discovery or mere data as such, even if they are expressed, explained, illustrated or embodied in a work
 News of the day and other miscellaneous facts having the character of mere items of press information
 Any official text of a legislative, administrative or legal nature, as well as any official translation thereof

Works of the government 
According to Section 176 of Republic Act 8293, no copyright shall be applied in any work of the Government of the Philippines. To exploit such works for profit, prior approval from the government agency or office should be made. Such agency or office may impose payment of royalties. It is not required to seek prior approval or conditions for the use for any purpose of statutes, rules and regulations, and speeches, lectures, sermons, addresses, and dissertations, pronounced, read or rendered in courts of justice, before administrative agencies, in deliberative assemblies and in meetings of public character.

Ownership 
According to Section 178 and 179 of Republic Act 8293, the copyright ownership is under the following rules:
 Copyright shall belong to the author of the work for original literary and artistic works
 For works with joint ownership, all the authors will be recognized as original owners. In the absence of agreement, their rights shall fall under the rules of co-ownership. In the case of works whose author per part can be identified, the author of each part shall be considered as the owner of the copyright in that respective part.
 For works created during the course of employment of an author, copyright ownership are as follows:
 If the object of ownership is not a part of the regular duties of the author, the employee shall get the copyright even if he/she used the time, facilities, and materials of the employer.
 If the work is an output of the author for his regularly-assigned duties, the employer shall get the copyright unless there is an agreement to the contrary.
 For works created in pursuance of a commission to the author by a person other than his/her employer, the ownership shall be granted to the person who commissioned but the copyright ownership shall remain with the creator, unless there is an agreement to the contrary.
 For audiovisual works, the copyright shall belong to the producer, the author of the scenario, the composer of the music, the film director, and the author of the work adapted. However, the producer shall exercise copyright only up to what is required for the exhibition of the work, except for the right to collect performing license fees for the performance of the compositions incorporated into the work.
 For letters, the copyright shall belong to the writer subject to Article 723 of the Civil Code.
 For anonymous works and works under a pseudonym, the publisher shall represent the work's author who are either anonymous or under a pseudonym, unless the contrary appears or the author discloses his/her identity.

Types of Rights under the Law of Copyright 
These are the rights that authors are entitled to according to the law of copyright, under Part IV of R.A. 8293, or the Intellectual Property Code of the Philippines.

Economic Rights
This allows a creator to ask for or obtain payment for the use of their work by third parties. According to Section 177 of the Law of Copyright, these rights consist of the right to allow, impede, or carry out the following by the author:
 Replication of the work, or a portion of the work
 Transformation or dramatization of the original work
 The first public distribution of the original work and each copy of the work
 Rental of the original work, or copy of the work embodied in any form, including audiovisuals, cinematography, sound recordings, computer programming, or graphic work, regardless of ownership of the original work
 Public display of the original or copy of the work
 Public performance of the work
 Other communication of the work to the public

Moral Rights 
These rights allow the author of the work to maintain their personal connection to the work, and to undertake measures in order to protect this connection. The author of the work, independent of the economic rights, also have the right to:
 Require the authorship of the work be attributed to him or her, meaning that the author may require that their name be displayed in a prominent fashion on a copy or public distribution or use of the work
 To make any transformation or adjustment to the work, or withhold it from publication
 To oppose any and all mutilation or any other derogatory action to the work which could potentially be detrimental to the author's honor and reputation
 To refuse to the use of the author's name on any mutilated or distorted version of his work, or any work not of his own creation

Exceptions to moral rights 
 Under Section 195 of the Law on Copyright, an author may waive his moral rights through a written contract. However, this contract is deemed invalid if it allows third parties to do the following:
 Make use of the author's name, the title of the work, or the author's reputation, in any version or adaptation of the work which could harm or be detrimental to the artistic reputation of another author
 Make use of an author's name for a piece of work not of his own creation
 The right of an author to have his contribution to a collective work credited to his name is deemed waived. A collective work here is defined as work created by two or more persons and under the understanding that the work will be attributed to the person whose direction said work is under. It is also understood that contributing natural persons will not be identified.
 If an author licenses or permits a third party to make use of their work, any necessary transformation, such as arranging, editing, or adaptations of work for use in publications, broadcast, or motion pictures, in accordance with the standards of the medium in which the work is to be used, shall not be found in contrary to the author's rights. In addition, the destruction of work unconditionally and completely transferred by an author shall likewise not be found in violation of the author's rights.

Resale rights 
The author and their heirs have the inalienable right to partake of 5% of the proceeds of the sale or lease of their original work (painting, sculpture, manuscript, composition). This inalienable right is in effect during the lifetime of the author, and for fifty years after their death.

Related rights 
Related rights are the rights of those whose help the author avails of in order to assist him in producing his work, and distributing this work to the public. These rights are also referred to as "neighboring rights" and include the following:
 Rights of performers
 Rights of producers of sound recordings
 Rights of broadcasting organizations

Infringement

Acts constituting infringement 
Section 216 of Republic Act No. 10372 states that a person infringes a right protected under this Act when one:
 Directly commits an infringement against copyright;
 Benefits from the infringing activity of another person who commits an infringement if the person benefiting has been given notice of the infringing activity and has the right and ability to control the activities of the other person;
 With knowledge of infringing activity, induces, causes or materially contributes to the infringing conduct of another.

Liabilities of infringement 
Any person found infringing rights protected under RA 10372 shall be liable:
 To pay the copyright owner actual damages, legal costs, and other expenses, that may have been incurred due to infringement as well as profits earned by the infringement.
Instead of recovering actual damages and profits, the copyright owner may file instead for an award of statutory damages for all infringements involved for not less than Fifty thousand pesos (Php 50,000.00). The court may consider the following factors in awarding statutory damages:
 The nature and purpose of the infringing act;
 The flagrancy of the infringement;
 Whether the defendant acted in bad faith;
 The need for deterrence;
 Any loss that the plaintiff has suffered or is likely to suffer by reason of the infringement; and
 Any benefit shown to have accrued to the defendant by reason of the infringement.

Limitations 
The following acts shall not constitute infringement of copyright:
 The recitation or performance of a work, if it had been made accessible to the public, and if done in private and free of charge. Performance of a work done under a charitable or religious institution shall also fall under this.
 The quotation of published works if they are compatible with fair use and only to an extent. This includes quotations from newspaper articles and periodicals provided that the source and the name of the author, if available, are mentioned.
 The reproduction of articles or communication by the mass media on current political, social, economic, scientific, or religious topics, lectures, addresses, and other works of the same nature, which are delivered in public and will only be used for information purposes.
 The reproduction and communication to the public of literary, scientific, or artistic works for reporting current events.
 The inclusion of a work in a publication, broadcast, or other forms of communication, if it will be used as aids in teaching and if it is compatible with fair use. Also, the author and the name of the author shall be mentioned.
 The recording of a work made in educational institutions for the use of that education institution. In accordance to this, the recording should be deleted after the first broadcast. Also, the said recording should not be from works which are part of a film except for brief excerpts of the work.
 The making of recordings by a broadcast organization for its own broadcasting purposes.
 The use of a work under the direction or control of the government or other institutions for the purpose of informing and public. It must also be compatible with fair use.
 The public performance of a work in a place without admission fee and for other purposes that does not include profit making.
 The public display of a work not made on screen or by other devices.
 The use of a work for judicial proceedings or for legal advice.
The provisions under this shall not be interpreted in a way that exploit the works and does not harm the interest of the right holder.

The Intellectual Property Code of the Philippines does not have a freedom of panorama provision, concerning the right to photograph artistic works in public spaces and use the resulting images for any purposes without the need to secure permission from the authors of the said works.

Fair use 
A fair use, in its most general sense, is the act of copying of copyrighted materials done for purposes such as commenting, criticizing, or parodying a copyrighted work without the permission from the copyright owner. It is used as a defense under copyright infringement.

Factors in determining fair use 
Under fair use, the use of a copyrighted work for purposes of criticizing, commenting, news reporting, teaching, creating researches, and other similar purposes is not an infringement of copyright. In determining whether the use made is under fair use, the following factors should be considered:
 The purpose of the use, including it is of a commercial nature or for non-profit purposes
 The nature of the copyrighted work
 The amount and sustainability of the portion used in relation to the copyrighted work as a whole
 The effect of the use to the value of the copyrighted work

List of reproductions allowed 
Given the mentioned rules and regulations above about copyright, reproduction of different materials, without the permission of the author, are still allowed given that they are done for reasons allowed by the Intellectual Property Code of the Philippines. Provided here are the reproductions and purposes allowed by the law.

Reproduction of published work 
Under Subsection 187.1 of the Intellectual Property Code of the Philippines, the reproduction of a published work shall be permitted without the owner's authorization given that the reproduction was made for research purposes. The permission granted here shall not extend to:
 A work of architecture in the form of building or other construction
 An entire or a substantial part of a book or of a musical work
 A compilation of data and other materials
 A computed program except those stated in Section 189
 Any reproduction that would exploit the work

Reprographic reproduction by libraries 
Any library or archive with non-profit purposes may make a single copy of the work without the authorization of the author given that:
 The work cannot be lent to user in its original form
 The works are isolated articles contained in composite works or portions of other published works and the reproduction can supply them
 The making of a copy is for the purposes of preserving or replacing the original in situations that it is destroyed or lost

Reproduction of computer program 
The reproduction of one back-up copy of a computer program shall be allowed without the permission of the copyright owner given that the reproduction is for the following uses:
 The use of the computer program in a computer for which it will be run
 To create a copy of the original computer program so that replacement is available if the original copy is lost or destroyed

Notable cases

Cases resulting to actions

La Concepcion College vs. Catabijan 
Author and publisher Raymund Sta. Maria Catabijan was issued 608,450.00 pesos in damages from La Concepcion College, who he claimed directly copied his work books in order to sell to students. La Concepcion College was found guilty of copyright infringement by the Intellectual Property Office of the Philippines (IPOPHL). The non-sectarian school was hence banned from publishing, selling and distributing copies of Mr. Catabijan's works.

EdCrish and Alkem vs. UPFA 
The Makati Regional Trial Court ruled on November 17, 2020, that EdCrisch International Inc. (EdCrisch) copied a substantial part of Panahon Kasaysayan at Lipunan: Kasaysayan ng Pilipinas texbook, published by the University Press of First Asia (UPFA), for their textbook Pilipinas: Isang Sulyap at Pagyakap. EdCrish and its Singaporean partner Alkem Company were both mandated by the court to cease production and distributions of the infringing textbook. The court also awarded UPFA ₱9.3 million in damages to be paid by both EdCrish and Alkem, bringing the 11-year copyright dispute to an end.

St. Mary's vs. Chinese firm and local partners 
Fujian New Technology Color Making and Printing Co. Ltd., based in China, and its local partners M.Y. Intercontinental Trading Corporation (MITC) and Allianz Marketing and Publishing Corporation, were ordered to pay ₱24,695,830 worth of damages to St. Mary's Publishing Corporation (SMPC). This stemmed from Fujian's failure to abide by their contract with SMPC to deliver promised textbooks that they printed. The Chinese printing firm instead gave the marketing contract to MITC, with Allianz as the importer. The erring parties were also ordered to stop publications, importations, and distributions of textbooks, inclusive of revised versions. This landmark decision was ruled by Manila City Regional Trial Court Branch 24 on December 8, 2017; the Court of Appeals of the Philippines upheld the decision on April 11, 2019. The latter court said that while Fujian is a foreign company, "its act constitute copyright infringement pursuant to the Berne Convention for the Protection of Literary and Artistic Works," of which the Philippines and China are signatories.

FILSCAP vs. Anrey 
The Supreme Court of the Philippines ruled, on August 11, 2022, that Anrey, Inc. must pay ₱10,000 worth of temperate damages to the Filipino Society of Composers, Authors and Publishers, Inc. (FILSCAP) and ₱50,000.00 worth of attorney's fees, all subject to varying interest rates: 12% per year "from September 8, 2009 until June 30, 2013," 6% per year "from July 1, 2013 until finality of the Court's judgment," and 6% per year from the judgment finality "until fully satisfied." The case was in response to the unlicensed use of copyrighted songs from FILSCAP's repertoire in two restaurants in Baguio owned by Anrey, Inc. in 2008. Anrey, Inc. responded to FILSCAP's letters of request to secure proper licensing by claiming their restaurants were playing "whatever was being broadcasted on the radio they were tuned in." Granting FILSCAP's petition for review on certiorari, the Supreme Court reversed the ruling of Branch 6 of Baguio Regional Trial Court dismissing FILSCAP's complaint as well as the Court of Appeals ruling that upheld the regional trial court's decision.

According to the high court, "the act of playing radio broadcasts containing copyrighted music through the use of loudspeakers (radio-over-loudspeakers) is, in itself, a performance." It added, it does not fall under fair use as the restaurants' manner of use of loudspeakers in transmitting musical content from radio is commercial. The Supreme Court stated that this decision "will also affect other uses in similar establishments like malls, department stores, retail stores, lounges and the like"; an opinion piece by Inquirer.net adds other establishments like hotels, cinemas, office spaces, salons, gymnasiums, and dance clubs, as well as concerts and events. However, the high court stressed that denying FILSCAP's petition would cause great harm to the economic rights of the copyright holders in which the users "use free radio reception" instead of paying royalties. By setting up a precedence for the proper use of copyrighted music, the Court said that this will create "a huge economic impact on the music industry in general."

Cases resulting to dismissals

ABS-CBN vs. Willing Willie 
ABS-CBN demanded 127 million pesos from their former reality show star, Willie Revillame, citing copyright infringement due to stark similarities in Revillame's show, Willing Willie, and ABS CBN's Wowowee. ABS-CBN listed 5 acts of plagiarism allegedly committed by Willing Willie in their complaint as follows:
 Willing Willie's opening song and dance number was similar to that of Wowowee's
 “BIGA-Ten” and “Big Time Ka,” both segments from the shows involved, bear similar names.
 “Willie of Fortune” and “Willtime Bigtime” are segments from both shows which resemble each other. ABS-CBN claimed that Willtime Bigtime resembled its show as it also showcases contestants relaying their personal stories before proceeding to play a singing/trivia game.
 April “Congratulations” Gustilo is one of several backup dancers from Wowowee who also appear in Willing Willie.
 Other striking similarities ABS-CBN claimed are found in Willing Willie's set design, stage, studio viewers' seats lay-out, lighting angles and camera angles. 
A 25-page ruling later on dated May 22, 2015 junked the case against Revillame, declaring it moot. After the Quezon City RTC demanded a 400 million peso bond from Revillame to answer any further damage the network might sustain, it was later discharged. Revillame signed a contract with GMA network two days prior to the ruling, to work on a new show entitled, “Wowowin."

Dating show alleged copyright infringement 
BJ Productions, Inc, produced a dating game show Rhoda and Me which aired from 1970 to 1977. On July 14, 1991, Francisco Joaquin, Jr., president of BJPI, saw on RPN Channel 9 an episode of It's a Date,  produced by IXL Productions, Inc. (IXL) with similar format of his dating show. Joaquin filed a case against IXL Productions, headed by Gabriel Zosa and RPN 9 before Regional Trial Court of Quezon City. Meanwhile, Zosa sought a review of the resolution of the Assistant City Prosecutor before the Secretary of Justice Franklin Drilon. On August 12, 1992, Drilon reversed the Assistant City Prosecutor's findings and directed him to move for the dismissal of the case against private respondents. Joaquin filed a motion for reconsideration, but his motion denied by Drilon on December 3, 1992.

The Supreme Court ruled on January 28, 1999 that the format or mechanics of a television show is not included in the list of the protected work provided by Presidential Decree no. 49 and Republic Act No. 8293. It further state that copyright, in the strict sense of the term, is purely a statutory right and does not extend to an idea, procedure, process, system, method or operation, concept, principles or discovery regardless of the form to which it is described, explained, and illustrated or embodied in the work.

Pearl & Dean Philippines vs. Shoemart 
Pearl and Dean Philippines is a corporation engaged in the manufacture of advertising display units simply referred to as light boxes. In 1985, Pearl and Dean negotiated with Shoemart, Inc. (now SM Prime Holdings) for the lease and installation of the light boxes in SM Makati and SM Cubao. Only SM Makati was signed but later rescinded by Pearl and Dean due to non-performance of their terms. Years later, Pearl and Dean found out that exact copies of its light boxes were installed at different SM stores. It was further discovered that SM's sister company North Edsa Marketing Inc. (NEMI), sold advertising space in lighted display units located in SM's different branches.

Pearl and Dean filed this instant case for infringement of trademark and copyright, unfair competition and damages. SM on its part maintained that it independently developed its poster panels using commonly known techniques and available technology, without notice of or reference to Pearl and Dean's copyright. Makati Regional Trial Court decided in favor of Pearl and Dean, finding SM and NEMI jointly and severally liable for infringement of copyright and infringement of trademark. On appeal, however, the Court of Appeals reversed the trial court. On August 15, 2003, Supreme Court strengthened the Court of Appeals' decision by stating Pearl and Dean never secured a patent for the light boxes  and the copyright patent is on its technical drawings within the category of "pictorial illustrations." It applied the similar ruling of G.R. No. 108946 (Joaquin, Jr. v. Drilon).

2016 ruling requiring evidence over suspicion 
On G.R. No. 195835, penned March 14, 2016, the Supreme Court ruled that For a claim of copyright infringement to prevail, the evidence on record must demonstrate: (1) ownership of a validly copyrighted material by the complainant; and (2) infringement of the copyright by the respondent. It further stated that probable cause  is not imputable against the respondent.

The ruling stemmed from a dispute between LEC Steel Manufacturing Corporation and Metrotech Steel Industries where the former accused the latter infringing its intellectual property rights. The LEC failed to substantiate the alleged reproduction of the drawings/sketches of hatch doors it copyrighted had had no proof that the Metrotech reprinted the copyrighted sketches/drawings of LEC's hatch doors. The raid conducted by the NBI on Metrotech's premises yielded no copies or reproduction of LEC's copyrighted sketches/drawings of hatch doors. What were discovered instead were finished and unfinished hatch doors.

References

External links

The Intellectual Property Code of the Philippines
Frequently asked questions on Philippine copyright law

Philippines
Law of the Philippines
Philippine intellectual property law